Nucleoside diphosphate kinase B is an enzyme that in humans is encoded by the NME2 gene.

Function 

Nucleoside diphosphate kinase (NDK) exists as a hexamer composed of 'A' (encoded by NME1) and 'B' (encoded by this gene) isoforms. Multiple alternatively spliced transcript variants encoding the same isoform have been found for this gene. Co-transcription of this gene and the neighboring upstream gene (NME1) generates naturally occurring transcripts (NME1-NME2) which encode a fusion protein consisting of sequence sharing identity with each individual gene product.

Interactions 

NME2 has been shown to interact with NME3 and HERC5.

References

Further reading